Weinmannia elliptica is a species of tree in the family Cunoniaceae. It is native to South America.

References

Trees of Peru
elliptica